David W. French is an American Republican Party politician serving as a  member of the Kansas House of Representatives from the 40th district. Elected in 2018, he assumed office on January 14, 2019.

Biography
Born and raised in Lansing, Kansas, French graduated from Midwestern State University in 1980 with a Master of Business Administration (MBA). Prior to entering politics, French served as an intelligence officer for the United States Army, then as a team lead for Cubic and lastly as an intelligence analyst for Leidos. In 2018, French ran for Kansas State House in the 40th district as a Republican and defeated Democratic incumbent Debbie Deere. French was re-elected in 2020.

References

Republican Party members of the Kansas House of Representatives
Living people
21st-century American politicians
Midwestern State University alumni
Year of birth missing (living people)